The 2000 Bankfin Cup was the second tier competition in the 62nd Currie Cup season since it started in 1889.

Competition

Qualification

The fourteen provincial teams were divided into two sections (called Section X and Section Y) during the 2000 Currie Cup qualification tournament. Each team played every other team in their section once. The three bottom-placed teams in each section qualified to the 2000 Bankfin Cup competition, with all points earned against the other Bankfin Cup teams carried forward to the Bankfin Cup. All teams played the teams that qualified from the other section once. Teams who qualified from the same section did not play each other again.

Teams received four points for a win and two points for a draw. Bonus points were awarded to teams that score four or more tries in a game, as well as to teams that lost a match by seven points or less. Teams were ranked by points, then points difference (points scored less points conceded).

The top four teams qualified for the title play-offs. In the semi-finals, the team that finished first had home advantage against the team that finished fourth, while the team that finished second had home advantage against the team that finished third. The winners of these semi-finals played each other in the final, at the home venue of the higher-placed team.

Teams

Team Listing

Log

The following playing records were brought forward from the 2000 Currie Cup qualification series:

Results

Round one

Round two

Round three

Semi-finals

Final

References

2000 Currie Cup
2000